The 1967 Belgian Grand Prix was a Formula One motor race held at Spa-Francorchamps on 18 June 1967. It was race 4 of 11 in both the 1967 World Championship of Drivers and the 1967 International Cup for Formula One Manufacturers. The 28-lap race was won by Eagle driver Dan Gurney after he started from second position. Jackie Stewart finished second for the BRM team and Ferrari driver Chris Amon came in third. Excluding the Indianapolis 500, this is the only win for a USA-built car as well as one of only two wins of an American-licensed constructor in Formula One. It was also the first win for an American constructor in a Grand Prix race since the Jimmy Murphy's triumph with Duesenberg at the 1921 French Grand Prix.

Race report 

Jim Clark led off the grid from pole position and maintained that position for the first 11 laps and was 20 seconds ahead of Jackie Stewart and Dan Gurney when he had to come into the pits for a plug change, which cost him two minutes. Stewart built up a comfortable lead, helped even further when Gurney had to come into the pits with fuel pressure problems, losing another 20 seconds. However, it was now Stewart's time for mechanical problems as his gearshift was faltering. Gurney set a new lap record to catch and pass him 8 laps from the end and gain a maiden victory for the beautiful magnesium and titanium Eagle car. The light weight and advanced  aerodynamics of the car made it very fast, and Gurney shattered Tony Brooks' record Grand Prix average of 143 mph (set some 8 years earlier) on his way to victory. The Eagle was timed at 196 mph on the back straight, an extraordinary speed for a car with an engine producing (at that time) something less than 400 h.p.

Mike Parkes had a horrendous crash on the first lap at the exit of Blanchimont after losing control (on oil spilled from Stewart's BRM); his Ferrari rolled a number of times and he was thrown out of the car. Doctors considered amputating his legs and he was in a coma for a week. He survived, but had broken both of his legs. Parkes never raced in Formula One again.

Classification

Qualifying

Race

Championship standings after the race

Drivers' Championship standings

Constructors' Championship standings

 Notes: Only the top five positions are included for both sets of standings.

References

Belgian Grand Prix
Belgian Grand Prix
Grand Prix
June 1967 sports events in Europe